Omar Ali Saifuddin I (Jawi:  عمر علي سيف الدين١; died 10 July 1795) was the 18th Sultan of Brunei from 1740 until his abdication in favor of his eldest son Muhammad Tajuddin in 1778. He succeeded his father-in-law, Sultan Hussin Kamaluddin as Sultan of Brunei upon the latter's abdication from the throne in 1740.

Background
His Highness was the son of Sultan Muhammad Alauddin Ibni Al Marhum Pengiran Di-Gadong Pengiran Muda Shah Mubin and Pengiran Anak Sharbanun binti Pengiran Bendahara Pengiran Untong.

Accession to the Throne
After Sultan Hussin Kamaluddin abdicated from the throne, Pengiran Muda Omar Ali Saifuddin ascended the throne to become the next Sultan of Brunei. According to Sir Hugh Low, the new Sultan was still very young when he ascended the throne.

Reign
 His Highness tried to preserve peace and prosperity in Brunei, as had been done by his predecessor.
 Thomas Forrest visited Brunei in February 1776.
 His Highness had sent an armed force to attack Manila and later captured it led by Pehin Orang Kaya Di-Gadong Seri Lela Awang Aliwaddin in 1769. His army defeated the Spaniards in Manila and captured some prisoners.
 Datuk Teting from Sulu, who defeated the British troops at Balambangan in 1774, tried to invade Brunei, but was defeated by Pengiran Temenggong Ampa, who was also the Sultan's uncle in 1775.

Death
His Highness died on 10 July 1795 during the reign of his eldest son, Muhammad Tajuddin. He was buried at the Kubah Makam Di Raja in Bandar Seri Begawan. He was the first Sultan to be buried there. He was known as 'Marhum Makam Besar'.

References

18th-century Sultans of Brunei
1711 births
1795 deaths